Farmington Schools may refer to:
Farmington School District, Arkansas
Farmington Public Schools (Connecticut)
Farmington Public Schools (Michigan)
Farmington Municipal Schools, New Mexico